Trip.com is an international online travel agency. The website is owned by Trip.com Group (formerly Ctrip.com International, Ltd. in China), one of the world's largest online travel agencies with over 400 million users worldwide, and also the parent of Skyscanner.  

The site provides booking services for flights, hotels, trains, car rentals, airport transfers, tours and attraction tickets, and claims to offer more than 1.2 million hotels in 200 countries and regions, as well as over 2 million flight routes connecting more than 5,000 cities. Train tickets for use in the UK, Germany, Japan, South Korea, and Mainland China are also available for purchase on the site.

Trip.com is available in 19 different languages, including English, Mandarin Chinese, Japanese, Korean, Russian, German, French, Italian, Spanish, Dutch, Turkish, Polish, Greek, Indonesian, Malaysian and Thai, with the mobile app also featuring Vietnamese and Filipino. It also provides localized English versions for Australia, Singapore, the United States and Hong Kong.  

Trip.com was acquired by Trip.com Group in October 2017.

Recent Announcements 

 In February 2018, Trip.com became the first third-party to sell Korail tickets online with the launch of its South Korea rail ticketing service.
 In March 2018, Trip.com partnered with Deutsche Bahn to sell German train tickets through its website and mobile app.
 In March 2018, Trip.com launched its car rentals service, spanning across over 6,000 cities. 
 In June 2018, airport transfer was launched on Trip.com's Hong Kong and English sites, initially covering more than 200 cities in 55 countries.
 In July 2019, Trip.com expanded the reach of its car rental service in four major language markets. 
 In December 2019 the website reported 200% year-on-year growth in the car rentals product range for the winter holiday season. 
 In September 2019, Trip.com joined the Singapore Tourism Board in a strategic partnership for destination marketing. 
 In 2019, adjacent to its parent company’s 20th anniversary event and announcement of its new Trip.com Group identity, Trip.com hosted its inaugural Airline Partner Conference, which brought together over 50 airlines.
 In January 2020, Trip.com partnered with British Airways and Iberia on the New Distribution Capability (NDC) standard to offer a more complete inventory on the website.

Acquisition by Ctrip 
CTrip acquired Trip.com in October, 2017.  The original business, built by entrepreneurs Travis Katz and Ori Zaltzman, was a travel booking site that featured user-generated content and "predictive intelligence-based technology."  At the time of acquisition, CTrip reported Trip.com had more than 60 million users.  The price of the deal was not disclosed.  The Palo Alto-based startup had raised $39 million in funding. Expedia, Redpoint Ventures and Battery Ventures were among the investors in the company, which was founded in 2010.

History of Brand
Prior to its acquisition by the Trip.com Group in 2017, the Trip.com brand had changed hands several times.

 The domain was first purchased in 1996 by Trip Software Systems, and later sold to TheTrip.com founder Antoine Toffa in 1998 for $5000
 In 1999, Galileo International purchased a 19% stake in Toffa’s Trip.com Inc., and in 2000, acquired the remaining stake of Trip.com for $214.4 million in a combination of cash and stock.
 In 2001, Cendant acquired Galileo, and combined Trip.com with another acquisition, CheapTickets, to create Trip Network Inc. In 2003, Cendant ceased operating the Trip.com domain.
 In 2009, Orbitz Worldwide, a company acquired by Cendant in 2004 for $1.25 billion in cash and later split into a separate publicly traded entity, resumed use of the Trip.com brand. 
 In 2013, Orbitz ceased operating the Trip.com website.
 In 2015, Expedia acquired Orbitz Worldwide, and inherited the Trip.com domain.
 In 2016, Gogobot, a travel booking and research company founded by entrepreneurs Travis Katz and Ori Zaltzman in 2010 acquired the Trip.com brand from Expedia and rebranded the service as Trip.com.
 In 2017, CTrip acquired Trip.com and repositioned the company as an international online travel agency.

Awards
2019 Google Material Design Award: Universality

References

External links
 

Trip.com Group
Online travel agencies
Hospitality companies established in 2017
Internet properties established in 2017
Companies of Hong Kong